This is a list of international trips made by Dorin Recean, the Prime Minister of Moldova since February 2023. 

Since he took office on 16 February 2023 he has made: 

 One visit to Romania.

2023

References 

Recean, Dorin